Diocese (or Bishopric or Eparchy) of Smolensk may refer to the following ecclesiastical jurisdictions :

 the present Russian Orthodox Diocese of Smolensk
 two former Catholic bishoprics :
 Roman Catholic Diocese of Smolensk (Latin)
 Ruthenian Catholic Eparchy of Smolensk (Eastern Catholic: Byzantine rite)